West Littleton is a village and former civil parish, now in the parish of Tormarton, in the South Gloucestershire district, in the ceremonial county of Gloucestershire, England. It is located between the M4 and the A420.  The closest amenities are in Marshfield and the historic city of Bath is a short distance to the south. The stately home, Dyrham Park, is located a few hundred metres from the village. In 1931 the parish had a population of 65.

West Littleton shot to international attention as being the hideout retreat for Hugh Grant at the time of his alleged affair with a Los Angeles prostitute.  The world's press descended upon this charming little village and camped outside Grant's house. The village boasts approximately 25 houses and has a population of around 50 inhabitants. There is a working farm, a red telephone box and a church. The Beaufort Hunt regularly uses the village green as a starting point for their hunts though this has been somewhat curtailed due to the recent legislation banning fox hunting.

West Littleton is considered a gem of a village with a farming background. Some houses in the village date back to the 15th century with some possibly even back to the 14th.

On 1 April 1935 the parish was abolished and merged with Tormarton.

References

External links

Villages in South Gloucestershire District
Former civil parishes in Gloucestershire